Roaring Brook (also known as Roaring Brook Creek) is a tributary of Hunlock Creek in Luzerne County, Pennsylvania, in the United States. It has one named tributary, which is known as Lewis Run. Additionally, a dammed pond known as Harris Pond is located at the stream's headwaters. The Roaring Brook Swamp, which is listed as a Locally Significant Area on the Luzerne County Natural Areas Inventory, is also located in the watershed.

Roaring Brook is designated as a Least Disturbed Stream. It is in the ridge and valley physiographic province. The surficial geology in the stream's vicinity consists of Wisconsinan Till, bedrock, Wisconsinan Ice Contact-Stratified Drift, alluvium, and sand and gravel pits.

Course

Roaring Brook begins in Harris Pond in Ross Township. It flows for a few miles in a shallow valley before exiting Ross Township. Upon leaving Ross Township, the stream enters Hunlock Township. It gradually turns southeast, passing by several ponds or small lakes before turning south-southeast flowing through the community of Roaring Brook. A short distance downstream of Roaring Brook, the stream receives its only named tributary, Lewis Run, from the left. The stream then turns southwest for a short distance and enters a much deeper and narrower valley. It this valley, it turns south-southeast for more than a mile before it reaches its confluence with Hunlock Creek.

Hydrology, geography, and geology

The surficial geology in the vicinity of Roaring Brook mainly features a glacial or resedimented till known as Wisconsinan Till. However, there are areas of bedrock consisting of sandstone and shale around the edges of the stream's valley. There is a large patch of Wisconsinan Ice-Contact Stratified Drift in the stream's lower reaches and a much smaller patch of alluvium near its headwaters. There is also a sand and gravel pit along the creek. This pit is the only such pit in the United States Geological Survey quadrangle of Sweet Valley.

Roaring Brook is in the Susquehanna Valley Section of the ridge and valley physiographic province. A strip mine is located along Roaring Brook in its lower reaches.

There are no instances of point source pollution in the watershed of Roaring Brook.

Watershed

The stream's mouth is in the United States Geological Survey quadrangle of Nanticoke. However, its source is in the quadrangle of Sweet Valley. The stream also passes through the quadrangle of Harveys Lake.

Roaring Brook is classified as a Least Disturbed Stream by the Pennsylvania Natural Heritage Program. Such streams are described as "high-quality stream segments" that "ideally have little disturbance from human influences and demonstrate natural ecological function".

At most 0.75 percent of the watershed of Roaring Brook is on developed land. No more than 28 percent of the watershed is on cropland, of which no more than 6 percent is row crops and no more than 22 percent is non-row crops. At least 70 percent of the watershed is forested.

No more than 1 percent of the riparian area of Roaring Brook is developed. No more than 20 percent is agricultural land and at least 75 percent is forested. There are fewer than ten road crossings in the watershed.

The headwaters of Roaring Brook are in a 30-acre lake known as Harris Pond. It is dammed by the Harris Pond Dam, which is made from earth, concrete, and masonry. As of 1981, the dam is in relatively good condition.

History
Roaring Brook was entered into the Geographic Names Information System on August 2, 1979. Its identifier in the Geographic Names Information System is 1185165.

Biology
Wild trout naturally reproduce in Roaring Brook from its headwaters downstream to its mouth.

A swamp known as Roaring Brook Swamp is situated along the eastern side of Roaring Brook in its upper reaches in Ross Township. The swamp is listed as a Locally Significant Area on the Luzerne County Natural Areas Inventory. It is classified as a third-growth mixed broadleaf and conifer swamp. The swamp contains marshy areas as well as old beaver dams.

The main tree species in the overstory of Roaring Brook Swamp include hemlock, white pine, yellow birch, red maple, and black ash. The plants in the swamp's understory include arrow-wood, silky dogwood, and winterberry. On the ground, the planets include sedges, wood fern, cinnamon fern, skunk cabbage, sphagnum moss, bedstraw, jewelweed, goldenrod, and horsetail.

Bird species inhabiting the Roaring Brook Swamp include eastern peewee, tufted titmouse, veery, ovenbird, red-eyed vireo, and Louisiana waterthrush. Wild trout naturally reproduce in Roaring Brook from its headwaters downstream to its mouth.

See also
List of rivers of Pennsylvania

References

Rivers of Luzerne County, Pennsylvania
Tributaries of the Susquehanna River
Rivers of Pennsylvania